There are several different experimental techniques that can be used to test the response of structures and soil or rock slopes to verify their seismic performance, one of which is the use of an earthquake shaking table (a shaking table, or simply shake table). This is a device for shaking scaled slopes, structural models or building components with a wide range of simulated ground motions, including reproductions of recorded earthquakes time-histories.

While modern tables typically consist of a rectangular platform that is driven in up to six degrees of freedom (DOF) by servo-hydraulic or other types of actuators, the earliest shake table, invented at the University of Tokyo in 1893 to categorize types of building construction, ran on a simple wheel mechanism. Test specimens are fixed to the platform and shaken, often to the point of failure. Using video records and data from transducers, it is possible to interpret the dynamic behaviour of the specimen. Earthquake shaking tables are used extensively in seismic research, as they provide the means to excite structures in such a way that they are subjected to conditions representative of true earthquake ground motions.

They are also used in other fields of engineering to test and qualify vehicles and components of vehicles that must respect heavy vibration requirements and standards. Some applications include testing according to aerospace, electrical, and military standards.

See also
Earthquake engineering

References

External links
Hydra shaker – European Space Agency

Earthquake engineering
Mechanical tests